A referendum on (United States) Public Law 81-600, granting improved self-government, was held in Puerto Rico on 4 June 1951. It was approved by 76.5% of voters.

Results

References

1951 referendums
1951
1951 in Puerto Rico
June 1951 events in North America